Kráľovský Chlmec (until 1948 Kráľovský Chlumec) is a town in the Trebišov District in the Košice Region of south-eastern Slovakia. It has a population of around 8,000.

Etymology
The name means "Royal Hill". Slovak chlm, Czech chlum, Polish chełm are derived from a Proto-Slavic chъlmъ - a hill, chlmec - a smaller hill, an elevated location.

History
The town was first mentioned in 1214 as Helmech. In 1848-1849, residents of Kráľovský Chlmec took part in the Civic Revolution and War of Independence. After the Treaty of Trianon in 1920, the town became part of Czechoslovakia. It was annexed again by Hungary in 1938 as a result of the First Vienna Award. After the Second world war it became part of Czechoslovakia again in 1945, officially in 1947, according to the Paris Peace Treaties.

Geography

Demographics
According to the 2011 census, the town had 8 033 inhabitants. 73.66% of inhabitants were Hungarians (5 670), 19.43% Slovaks (1 496), 3.95% Gypsy (304) and 0.26% Czechs (20).

Education

Gymnázium Kráľovský Chlmec The Royal Grammar School Chlmec opened in 1949. Teaches both in Slovak and Hungarian language.

Notable people
Ilona Aczél (1884-1940), actress

Twin towns — sister cities

Kráľovský Chlmec is twinned with:

 Ferencváros (Budapest), Hungary
 Felsőzsolca, Hungary
 Kisvárda, Hungary
 Kanjiža, Serbia
 Rakovník, Czech Republic
 Sfântu Gheorghe, Romania
 Berehove, Ukraine

References

External links
 Official website 

Villages and municipalities in Trebišov District
Cities and towns in Slovakia
Hungarian communities in Slovakia